Williamson House is a historic home located at Louisburg, Franklin County, North Carolina.   It was built about 1855, and is a one-story, three bay by two bay, Greek Revival style frame cottage dwelling.  It has a hipped roof and rests on a brick basement.

It was listed on the National Register of Historic Places in 1975. It is located in the Louisburg Historic District.

References

Houses on the National Register of Historic Places in North Carolina
Houses completed in 1855
Greek Revival houses in North Carolina
Houses in Franklin County, North Carolina
National Register of Historic Places in Franklin County, North Carolina
Individually listed contributing properties to historic districts on the National Register in North Carolina